The 2021 División Intermedia season, named "Cincuentenario del Club Atlético 3 de Febrero y Homenaje al Lic. Miguel Ángel Cañete Alderete", was the 103rd season of the second-tier league of Paraguayan football and 24th under the Paraguayan División Intermedia name. The season began on 9 April and ended on 26 October 2021. The fixtures for the season were announced on 15 January 2021.

The competition returned after a one-year hiatus as the 2020 seasons of the lower-tier club tournaments of Paraguayan football were cancelled by the Paraguayan Football Association due to the COVID-19 pandemic.

General Caballero (JLM) won their first División Intermedia title with four matches to spare, following a 4–1 victory over Rubio Ñu on 27 September 2021.

Format
18 teams took part in the competition, which was played under a double round-robin system with teams playing each other twice, once at home and once away for a total of 34 matches. The top three teams at the end of the season were promoted to the Paraguayan Primera División for the 2022 season, with the champions also qualifying for the 2022 Copa Sudamericana, while the fourth-placed team will play a play-off against the ninth-placed team of the Primera División relegation table for promotion to the top flight.

The bottom three teams in the relegation table at the end of the season were relegated: teams located within 50 kilometres of Asunción were relegated to Primera División B, while teams from outside Greater Asunción and the Central Department were relegated to Primera División B Nacional.

Teams
18 teams competed in the season: 11 teams from the previous División Intermedia season plus the four teams relegated from Primera División in its 2019 and 2020 seasons (Deportivo Capiatá, Deportivo Santaní, General Díaz and San Lorenzo), the top two teams from the 2019 Primera División B (Sportivo Ameliano and Tacuary) and the 2019 Primera División B Nacional champions Guaraní from Trinidad.

Pastoreo F.C., who were entitled to enter this year's competition as 2019–20 Campeonato Nacional de Interligas champions, had their debut postponed to 2022 per decision by the APF's Executive Committee, since Guaraní de Trinidad already held the berth reserved to the Unión del Fútbol del Interior (UFI) for this season.

Stadia and locations

Standings

Results

Top scorers

Source: APF

Promotion play-off
The fourth-placed team in the División Intermedia, Sportivo Ameliano, played a double-legged promotion play-off against Sportivo Luqueño, the ninth-placed team of the relegation table of the 2021 Primera División season. The winner was promoted to the 2022 Primera División.

Sportivo Ameliano won 4–3 on aggregate and were promoted to Primera División.

Relegation
Relegation is determined at the end of the season by computing an average of the number of points earned per game over the past three seasons. The three teams with the lowest average were relegated to the Primera División B or Primera División B Nacional for the following season, depending on their geographical location.

 Source: APF

See also
2021 Paraguayan Primera División season
2021 Copa Paraguay

References

External links
División Intermedia on the APF's website

Paraguayan División Intermedia
Par
I